The Metropolitan Theater, abbreviated as the MET, is a historic Philippine Art Deco building located in Plaza Lawton in Ermita, Manila. It is recognized as the forefront of the Art Deco architectural style in the Philippines. 

Designed by architect Juan M. Arellano, it was inaugurated on December 10, 1931. The theater was heavily damaged during the Battle of Manila and subsequently went through several restoration programs of varying levels of success. After its most extensive public restoration efforts, the Metropolitan Theater reopened on December 10, 2021, the 90th anniversary of its inauguration. It is currently under the administration of the National Commission for Culture and the Arts (NCCA).

In 1976, the Metropolitan Theater was declared a National Historical Landmark by the National Historical Commission of the Philippines (NHCP). In 2010, the National Museum recognized the Met as a National Cultural Treasure.

History

Origins, opening, and pre-war years (1924–1942)
In 1924, during the American Colonial period, the Philippine Legislature approved the project proposal of Senator Juan B. Alegre to build a "people's theater" in the Mehan Garden. There was little, however, that came of it until 1928, when Manila Mayor Tomas Earnshaw spearheaded a project to build a theater. The City of Manila leased out 8,293 square meters of public land in the Mehan Garden to the newly-formed Metropolitan Theater Company at ₱1.00 for 99 years.

The Metropolitan Theater Company was made up of wealthy Manila businessmen who would provide the capital for the venture. It was headed by Horace B. Pond of the Pacific Commercial Company, who was joined on the Board by Antonio Melian of El Hogar Filipino, Enrique Zóbel of Ayala y Compañia, University of the Philippines President Rafael Palma, Senator Manuel Camus, Leopold Kahn of Levy Hermanos, and businessman J.L. Pierce. The Metropolitan Theater Company raised ₱1 million to fund the project through community efforts, including fundraising dinners and the selling of stock to the public at affordable rates, Class A shares for ₱100.00 and Class B shares for ₱5.00 par value.

Filipino architect Juan M. Arellano was commissioned by the government to design the theater and was sent to the United States to study under Thomas W. Lamb, one of America's leading architects in theater design. At that point, Arellano was known for his neoclassical architectural style, but the Metropolitan Theater marked his departure towards more modern designs.

The cornerstone was laid in February 1928, with construction by Pedro Siochi & Co. as contractors.

The Metropolitan Theater was inaugurated on December 10, 1931. In attendance were Mayor Earnshaw, Senate President Manuel L. Quezon, Interim American Governor George C. Butte, Speaker of the House Sergio Osmeña, and other prominent government leaders, businessmen, and society figures.

During the following pre-war decade, it hosted international artists including Ted Shawn, Jascha Heifetz, Amelita Galli-Curci, and Fritz Kreisler. The Met also hosted the local dance productions of Lubov Adameit, Leonor Orosa-Goquingco, Paul Szilard, and Trudl Dubsky. Other significant events at the Met include the premier of legendary production studio LVN Pictures' inaugural film Giliw Ko (1939).

World War II (1942–1945)
Unlike other similar establishments, during the Japanese Occupation in the Second World War, the Metropolitan Theater was still active. It became the home of the New Philippines Symphony Orchestra, conducted by Francisco Santiago, which held its inaugural concert in July 1942. Alongside concerts and film screenings, the Met was the stage for the performances of the Dramatic Philippines theater group founded by Francisco "Soc" Rodrigo and Narciso Pimentel, Jr. from 1943 to 1944. They mostly performed Rodrigo's translations and adaptations such as Edmond Rostand's Cyrano de Bergerac set in contemporary Manila.

The Japanese authorities also used the Metropolitan Theater for their cultural and political activities. On October 17 and 20, 1943, two Independence Symphony Concert were held at the Met to celebrate Japan's declaration of the Philippines as an independent republic under President Jose P. Laurel. The building was also used as a meeting center for the KALIBAPI political party.

In 1945, the Metropolitan Theater was bombed by the American liberation forces during the Battle of Manila. Although the Met lost its roof, the walls of the structure stood.

Post-war years (1945–2015) 
In the subsequent post-war years, the shell of the Met was used for a variety of commercial establishments and a home for informal settlers.

During the Marcos administration, First Lady Imelda Marcos initiated the public restoration of the Metropolitan Theater, along with other historical buildings. In 1978, ₱30 million was allocated for the restoration through a loan from the Government Service Insurance System (GSIS). The restoration was done under the supervision of the architects Otilio and Alejandro Arellano, both nephews of the Met's original architect Juan M. Arellano.

The Metropolitan Theater re-opened in December 1978, after just four months of work, making the pre-Christmas opening deadline desired by Imelda Marcos. President Ferdinand Marcos said that he hoped the Metropolitan Theater would "emerge as the shining monument to the cultural enlightenment of the New Filipino." The Met re-opened with a production of Rosauro de la Cruz's "Isang Munting Alamat" produced by the Kabataang Barangay, then-chaired by President Marcos's daughter Imee.

From 1979 to 1986, the Metropolitan Theater staged five to six shows yearly. Due to the lack of sponsorships, Executive Director Conchita Sunico rented out the space to GMA TV for Vilma Santos's variety show Vilma! and leased out office space in the building, allowing it to survive in spite of financial difficulties.

The Met closed its doors again in 1996 following conflicts of ownership between the Manila City government and the Government Service Insurance System (GSIS). 

In 2010, President Gloria Macapagal Arroyo attempted to revive the Metropolitan Theater, to no avail. That same year, the Met was recognized as a National Cultural Treasure under the National Cultural Heritage Act.

Under the NCCA, restoration, and re-opening (2015–)
In May 2015, the Department of Budget and Management released ₱270 million from the National Endowment Fund for Culture and the Arts for the purchase of the Metropolitan Theater from its owner, the Government Service Insurance System (GSIS). The amount was released to the National Commission for Culture and the Arts (NCCA) so they could exercise their right of first refusal on the sale of national cultural treasures based on the National Cultural Heritage Act. On June 30, 2015, the GSIS turned over ownership of the Met to the NCCA.

Soon after, in December 2015, the NCCA launched the "METamorphasis" project whereby students interacted with the theater through bi-weekly cleanup drives, which included music programs and tours of the theater grounds. The project ran until April 2016, paving the way for the eventual restoration of the building.

The initial restoration construction work began in February 2017 but was suspended when discovering of original features led the NCCA to revise the designs, with work resuming in 2019. The goal of the NCCA-led restoration was to conserve the building and restore it to its pre-war state as designed by Juan M. Arellano. Thus, additional structures, such as those added during the 1978 restoration under Imelda Marcos, were removed. The first phase of the restoration focused on the Main Theater and was completed by March 2020. The second phase focused on the exteriors, while the third and final phase focused on fixing the office spaces and the Grand Ballroom.

On December 10, 2021, the Metropolitan Theater celebrated its 90th anniversary with its formal re-opening. Previously, it had a soft opening in June 2021, with its official reopening postponed several times due to the COVID-19 pandemic.

Architecture 
The Metropolitan Theater was designed by Filipino architect Juan M. Arellano in the Art Deco style. Arellano was inspired by the phrase "On Wings of Song" for the structural configuration of the building: a rectangular-shaped auditorium flanked by pavilions on either side. Throughout the design, Arellano weaved Filipino decorative elements into the Art Deco style. Philippine Magazine editor A.V.H. Hartendorp described the style as "modern expressionistic."

Exterior 
The façade's focal point is its proscenium-like central window of stained glass that corresponds with the shape and scale of the Main Theater inside. The stained glass marquee was executed by the Kraut Art Glass Company, with the "Metropolitan" label backlit and surrounded by Filipino floral motifs.

It is highlighted on both ends by the curving walls with colorful decorated tiles in resemblance with the batik patterns from Southeast Asia. There are also moldings of zigzag and wavy lines that go with the sponged and painted multi-colored massive walls. The wall that framed the stained glass is a segmented arch with rows of small finials on the upper edge of the wall. Angkor Wat-inspired minarets crown the top of the concave roof which suggested its status as a theater back in its prime days. Located in the entrance are elaborate wrought iron gates which are patterned into leaf designs and various lines. Accenting the ground level are Capiz lamps and banana-leaf formed pillars which go alternately with the theater's entrances.

Standing at the back is the fly tower decorated on the sides by geometric motifs. The ceiling profile of the auditorium was reflected in the exterior through stepped vaults.

Interior

Foyer 
The Main Theater is accessed through a foyer with a two-story ceiling and stairways on either side leading to the balcony. By the stairways are the Adam and Eve bronze sculptures done by Italian artist Franceso Riccardo Monti. On opposite sides of the foyer are two mural paintings of Fernando Amorsolo, The Dance and The History of Music. Since the 1996 foreclosure, the original murals are in the GSIS Museum and so reproductions were made for the NCCA-led restoration. The grillwork in the foyer includes drooping floral balustrade in a geometric Art Deco style, originally wrought by Arcadio Arellano, brother and collaborator of the Met's architect Juan M. Arellano.

Main Theater 
In 2020, during its renovation, the capacity of the Main Theater was reduced from 1,600 to 990, and the floor's elevation was adjusted to comply with safety regulations.

The ceiling is decorated with Art Deco mangoes, bananas, and tropical leaves bas-reliefs designed by Isabelo Tampinco.

Above the proscenium arch are eight bas-relief figures by Francesco Riccardo Monti. Originally intending to reproduce the figures from historical photographs, in 2017, the NCCA were surprised to discover the original Monti figures intact after dismantling the anomalous additions from the 1978 restoration.

Gallery

References

Works cited 

Art Deco architecture in the Philippines
Theaters in Manila
Cultural Properties of the Philippines in Metro Manila
Landmarks in the Philippines
Buildings and structures in Ermita
Theatres completed in 1931
National Historical Landmarks of the Philippines
1931 establishments in the Philippines
Juan M. Arellano buildings